Heydarabad (also Romanized as Ḩeydarābād; also known as Geydarābād, Haidarābād, Haiderabad, and Ḩedarābād) is a village in Guney-ye Gharbi Rural District, Tasuj District, Shabestar County, East Azerbaijan Province, Iran. According to the 2006 census, its population was 537, in 157 families.

References 

Populated places in Shabestar County